Westminster City School is a state-funded secondary academy for boys, with a mixed sixth form, in Westminster, London. The school educates over 800 students, with links to more than 100 different cultures, in a central London location. The school offers places at Year 7 entry, each year, to boys of Christian faith, other world faiths, and those of no faith. The current headteacher is Peter Broughton, while the current deputy headteachers are Jen Lockyer and Simon Brown.

The school became an academy in 2012. In February 2017, Ofsted rated it "good".

History

Today 

GCSE Results Day 2021 saw the school's GCSE pass rate rise to 85% across all qualifications, following a challenging period of study for our young people with the global pandemic disrupting learning. In addition, 35% of all the school's GCSEs were graded at 9 to 7 (or BTEC equivalent) which corresponds to the old-style top grades of A* and A.

A Level Results Day 2021 showed a string of excellent grades for all  sixth formers, including ten students awarded all grades at A* or A. Across the year group, the school saw 57% of students awarded A* to B grades, and 85% awarded A* to C grades. 

In autumn 2021, over 90% of the school's outgoing Year 13 students started university, with almost 40% joining top Russell Group institutions.

Foundation 
The charters and foundations of several historic charity schools were by Act of Parliament in 1873 incorporated into the Grey Coat Hospital Foundation and United Westminster Schools (UWS) Foundation. UWS comprised the Westminster City School and Emanuel School, Wandsworth; the Grey Coat Hospital Foundation comprised the Grey Coat Hospital, Westminster and Queen Anne's School, Caversham. In 1910, the Worshipful Company of Clothworkers transferred the Sutton Valence School in Kent into UWS.

Westminster City School is amalgamation of the former Brown Coat, Green Coat and Black Coat schools. Key dates in its history are:

1590: Lady Dacre petitions Queen Elizabeth I for a royal charter for a hospital in "this City of Westminster" and to provide "instruction of certain boys and girls".
1601: Queen Elizabeth grants order of incorporation for Emmanuel Hospital.
1624: Green Coat School Westminster opened.
1633: Charter of King Charles I for St Margaret's Hospital.
1654: A hospital, along with almshouses and a school, is founded by James Palmer in Westminster.
1671: Following a period of closure, Palmer's School is reopened as the Black Coat School.
1677: Bequest of benefactor Emery Hill to the Brown Coat School.
1688: Blue Coat School founded.
1698: Grey Coat Hospital founded.
1706: Queen Anne granted a royal charter to Grey Coat Hospital.
1728: Accommodation for children added at St. Margaret's Hospital.
1736: Brown Coat School formally opened.
1847: Brown Coat school numbers increased to 60.
1870: Elementary education for all provided by an Act of Parliament.
1873: Following a vote in Parliament, Queen Victoria approved amalgamation under United Westminster Schools.
1874: The school was formally opened.
1876: The 'foundation stone' was laid in Palace Street by Sir Sydney Waterlow.
1877: The new School building was opened by the Dean of Westminster, Arthur Penrhyn Stanley.
1890: School officially named Westminster City School.
1900: London County Council placed a statue of Waterlow in Waterlow Park.
1901: The sculptor Frank Taubman placed a copy of the statue of Waterlow in front of the school.
1906: First issue of school magazine.
1908: Creation of house system, along with prefects.
1908: Old Westminster Citizen's Association and Football Club launched.
1909: New Assembly Hall opened along with other improved accommodation.
1910: Governors obtain lease of playing fields in Turney Road, Dulwich.
1914–18: School life continued, although there were many fatalities amongst Old Boys.
1918: Education Act gives Westminster City grammar school status.
1922: Memorial to Old Boys killed in the war opened in the vestibule.
1924: Grand Pageant organised to celebrate the jubilee of the foundation, St. Margaret's Hospital tercentenary and the anniversary of Lady Dacre's bequest.
1931: School orchestra filmed by Pathe News and shown in cinemas across the country.
1934: Mitcham pavilion opened and sports activities moved from Dulwich.
1934: Number of school houses reduced from eight to four.
1936: School gym opened.
1937: Seven boys chosen for the Westminster Abbey choir at the coronation of King George VI.
1939: Outbreak of the Second World War with school evacuated to Tonbridge, Kent area, amalgamating with the Judd School.
1940s: Westminster City School Palace Street building was badly damaged in an air raid during the Blitz.
1944: School moved from Tonbridge to Exmouth.
1945: With the end of the Second World War, school re-assembles in Westminster with numbers now down to 350.
1949: Inspectors praised academic achievements but were disturbed by the condition of the bomb-battered building.
1951: Appointment of R Fern as headmaster and GCE Ordinary Levels (O Levels) and GCE Advanced Levels (A Levels) introduced.
1953: School choir were represented at the coronation of Queen Elizabeth II.
1957: Work commences on new laboratories over the school hall.
1958: Golden jubilee year of the Old Westminster Citizens' Association. The school was used as a location for the film Inn of the Sixth Happiness starring Ingrid Bergman.
1963: 330th anniversary of the Charles I charter celebrated with a service at St. Margaret's Church, attended by Queen Elizabeth, the Queen Mother who visited the school after the service.
1965: University places gained reach high of 48.
1973: Centenary of United Westminster Schools celebrated with a world premiere of "Westminster Psalms" by Carl Bontoft.
1975: John White appointed headmaster.
1977: Westminster City School celebrates 100 years at Palace Street and becomes a four form entry mixed ability comprehensive school.
1980: New squash courts get go ahead.
1981: Building fund appeal launched at First School Association science evening.
1983: Westminster City School and its Origins, by R. Carrington, is published.
1985: School play Sergeant Musgrove's Dance transfers to the Edinburgh Festival.
1991: School financial pressures cause widespread redundancies and cuts.
1997: School placed in special measures.
1999: School released from special measures.
2001: New science block completed.
2002: School presents play on the life of Edward the Confessor at Westminster Abbey.
2002: David Maloney appointed headteacher.
2004: A teacher was raped by a pupil after class. The pupil involved was sent to prison and the teacher eventually won compensatory damages and legal costs from the school.
2008: Work commences on transformation of Westminster City School, following the 'Building Schools for the Future' bid by Westminster City Council.
2009: School buildings are refurbished and new modern buildings are completed with the school becoming a specialist science college.
2012: Secretary of State for Education approved the academy converters application.
2014: James Wilson appointed headteacher.
2018: Peter Broughton takes up post as headteacher.
2018: £6 million Jack Pouchot Building officially opened by Prince Edward, Duke of Kent. It improves music, art and drama spaces for pupils and is named after Jack Pouchot, a former pupil and the youngest man to be decorated with the Distinguished Conduct Medal in battle during the First World War.
2019: Over 20 Westminster City School pupils attend a service at Westminster Abbey, to commemorate the 750th anniversary of the church, in the presence of Queen Elizabeth II and Camilla, Duchess of Cornwall.
GCSE Results Day 2020 saw Westminster City School’s pass rate rise to the highest in the school’s history, with 83% of all grades being at 4 and above, while A Level Results Day 2020 saw almost 10% of the year group receive an A* and the pass rate rise to a 100%.
In 2021, Westminster City School launched an initiative with investment company, Polar Capital, that gives all in Year 12 a free laptop and eligibility for one or two Aspire Scheme bursaries, worth over £20,000 per year, for each year of future UK university study.

School houses and pastoral support

For some social and competitive purposes, students are grouped into houses. The names given are also used for school buildings and represent some of the historic charity schools in Westminster.

Dacre's: Commemorating the foundation of Lady Anne Dacre, who died in 1595 and whose executors established Emanuel Hospital, incorporated by Queen Elizabeth I in 1601.
Hill: Retaining the name of the school established in 1647 by Emery Hill, a churchwarden in the parish of St Margaret's, Westminster.
Kings: In 1633, Charles I granted a charter of incorporation for the education of poor boys and girls in Westminster which was aided annually by King Charles II.
Palmer's: Continuing the tradition of the school provided in 1645 by James Palmer of the parish of St Margaret's Westminster.
St Margaret's: Arising from the St Margaret's Hospital, established by the churchwardens of St Margaret's in 1624.
Waterlow: Commemorating Sir Sydney Waterlow, the Lord Mayor of London, who was elected the first chairman of governors in 1873 and filled his post for over a quarter of a century.

Pastoral support

Around 130 boys are admitted in each year group, arranged in forms. Each form is named after one of the six houses and known by the initial letter of the house name. A form tutor is assigned to each group and will have oversight of each student's well-being and academic progress. The form tutor is the primary point of contact between parents/carers and the school.

Headteachers
REH Goffin 1874 – 1906
E H Stevens 1906 – 1930{name as it appears on a postcard}
JC Dent 1930 – 1950
RJ Fearn 1951 – 1954 
GR Shutt 1955 – 1966
S Allder 1966 – 1972
JH White 1973 – 1983
D Garvie 1983 – 1988
J Noakes 1988 – 1992
M Billingham 1992 – 1995
J Harding 1995 – 1998
R Tanton 1998 – 2002
D Maloney 2002 – 2013
J Wilson 2014 – 2017
S Solani 2017 (Michaelmas term only)
P Broughton 2018 – present

The Old Westminster Citizens' Association
The Old Westminster Citizens' Association aims to keep alumni from around the world informed and in touch. Started in 1908, it maintains close links with the school and, through its trust fund, provides finance to support a number of activities and projects.

Notable former students

Recent living alumni
Gary Alexander (born 15 August 1979) is an English footballer.
John Boyega (born 17 March 1992) is a British-Nigerian actor, known for the lead role in 2011 film Attack the Block and his main role in Star Wars: The Force Awakens, Star Wars: The Last Jedi, and Star Wars: The Rise of Skywalker. 
Terry Marsh (born 7 February 1958) is a former professional boxer who was an undefeated world champion.
Jesurun Rak-Sakyi (born 5 October 2002) is an English professional footballer who plays as a winger for Premier League club Crystal Palace.
Wes Streeting (born 21 January 1983) is the Labour Member of Parliament for Ilford North and Shadow Secretary of State for Health and Social Care.

Other notable pupils (from Westminster City Grammar School days)

John Walter Baxter (4 June 1917 – 21 October 2003) was a British civil engineer.
Brebis Bleaney CBE FRS (6 June 1915 – 4 November 2006) was a British physicist, known for contributions to electron paramagnetic resonance (EPR).
Martin Broughton (born 1947) is a British businessman who is the current chairman of British Airways.
James Dale Cassels (22 March 1877 – 7 February 1972) was a British judge, journalist and Conservative politician.
Stuart Davies (5 December 1906 – 22 January 1995) was an aeronautical engineer, president from 1971 to 1972 of the Royal Aeronautical Society (RAeS), and assistant chief designer for Avro during World War Two, contributing to the Lancaster, and Avro York, becoming chief designer from 1945 to 1955.
Peter Galloway (born 1954) is an Anglican priest and historian.
Andy Hamilton (born 28 May 1954) is a British comedian, game show panellist, television director, comedy screenwriter, and radio dramatist.
Sir Cyril Hinshelwood (19 June 1897 – 9 October 1967) was an English physical chemist and winner of the Nobel Prize in 1956.
Anatole Kaletsky (born 1952) has been an economics journalist for The Economist magazine and the Financial Times and The Times newspapers.
Percy Edgar Lambert, (1881 – 31 October 1913) was the first person to drive an automobile a hundred miles in an hour.
 John Auguste Pouchot (known as Jack) was the youngest man to be decorated with the Distinguished Conduct Medal in battle during the First World War.
Walter Layton, 1st Baron Layton (15 March 1884 – 14 February 1966), was a British economist, editor and newspaper proprietor.
Brian Lightman (15 June 1955), was general secretary from 2010 to 2016 of the Association of School and College Leaders (ASCL).
Roger Livesey (1906 – 1976), British film actor, perhaps best known for the feature film A Matter of Life and Death.
Andy Mackay (born 23 July 1946) musician, best known as a founding member of the art-rock group Roxy Music.
Edgar Mountain (2 April 1901 – 30 April 1985) competed in over 800m distance at the Olympic Games in both 1920 and 1924.
Alan Francis Bright Rogers (1907 – 2003) was an Anglican Bishop who held three different posts in an ecclesiastical career spanning over half a century.
Denis Rooke (2 April 1924 – 2 September 2008) was a British industrialist and engineer.
Norman Rosenthal (born 1944) is an independent curator and art historian.
Arnold Spencer-Smith (17 March 1883 – 9 March 1916) was a British clergyman and amateur photographer who joined Sir Ernest Shackleton's Imperial Trans-Antarctic Expedition, 1914–17.
John Edward Tomlinson, Baron Tomlinson (born 1 August 1939) is a British Labour Co-operative politician. He is currently a life peer in the House of Lords.
Christopher Warren-Green (born 30 July 1955, Gloucestershire) is a British violinist and conductor.
Robin Le Mesurier (1954 – 2022) was a British guitarist. He was the son of comedy actors John Le Mesurier and Hattie Jacques.

References

External links
 Official website
  at Ofsted website
 at Government website EduBase
 Old Westminster Citizens' Association
 Westminster City School Lodge
 BBC School Report

Secondary schools in the City of Westminster
Boys' schools in London
Educational institutions established in 1877
1877 establishments in England
Academies in the City of Westminster
Victoria, London